Shaktipat or Śaktipāta (Sanskrit, from shakti "(psychic) energy" and pāta, "to fall") refers in Hinduism to the transmission (or conferring) of spiritual energy upon one person by another or directly from the deity. Shaktipat can be transmitted with a sacred word or mantra, or by a look, thought or touch – the last usually to the ajna chakra or agya chakra  or third eye of the recipient.

Saktipat is considered an act of grace (anugraha) on the part of the guru or the divine. It cannot be imposed by force, nor can a receiver make it happen. The very consciousness of the god or guru is held to enter into the Self of the disciple, constituting an initiation into the school or the spiritual family (kula) of the guru. It is held that Shaktipat can be transmitted in person or at a distance, through an object such as a flower or fruit.

Levels of intensity

Levels
In Kashmir Shaivism, depending on its intensity, Śaktipāt can be classified as:

  - the so-called "Super Supreme Grace" - produces immediate identity with Śiva and liberation; such a being goes on to become a siddha master and bestows grace from his abode (Siddhaloka), directly into the heart of deserving aspirants
  - "Supreme Medium Grace" - such a being becomes spiritually illuminated and liberated on his own, relying directly on Śiva, not needing initiation or instruction from other exterior guru. This is facilitated by an intense awakening of his spiritual intuition (pratibhā) which immediately eliminates  ignorance
  - "Supreme Inferior Grace" - the person who received this grace strongly desires to find an appropriate guru, but he does not need instruction, but a simple touch, a look or simply being in the presence of his master is enough to trigger in him to the state of illumination
  - "Medium Supreme Grace" - a disciple who receives this grace desires to have the instruction and initiation of a perfect guru; in time he becomes enlightened. However, he is not totally absorbed into this state during his lifetime and receives a permanent state of fusion with Śiva after the end of his life
  - "Medium Middle Grace" - such a disciple will receive initiation from his guru and have an intense desire to attain liberation, but at the same time he still has desire for various enjoyments and pleasure; after the end of his life, he continues to a paradise where he fulfills all his desires and after that he receives again initiation from his master and realizes permanent union with Śiva
  - "Medium Inferior Grace" - is similar to "Medium Middle Grace" except that in this case the aspirant desires worldly pleasures more than union with Śiva; he needs to be reincarnated again as a spiritual seeker to attain liberation
  - "Inferior Grace" - for those who receive this level of grace, the aspiration to be united with Śiva is present only in times of distress and suffering; the grace of Śiva needs to work in them for many lifetimes before spiritual liberation occurs

Table

Descriptions
Swami Muktananda, in his book Play of Consciousness, describes in great detail his experience of receiving shaktipat initiation from his guru Bhagawan Nityananda and his spiritual development that unfolded after this event.

Paul Zweig has written of his experience of receiving shaktipat from Muktananda. In the same book Itzhak Bentov describes his laboratory measurements of kundalini-awakening through shaktipat, a study held in high regard by the late Satyananda Saraswati, founder of the Bihar School of Yoga, and by Hiroshi Motoyama, author of Theories of the Chakras.

Barbara Brennan describes shaktipat as the projection of the guru's "aura" on the disciple who thereby acquires the  same mental state, hence the importance of the high spiritual level of the guru. The physiological phenomena of rising kundalini then naturally manifest.

In his book, Building a Noble World, Shiv R. Jhawar describes his shaktipat experience at Muktananda's public program at Lake Point Tower in Chicago on September 16, 1974 as follows:

“Baba [Swami Muktananda] had just begun delivering his discourse with his opening statement: ‘Today’s subject is meditation. The crux of the question is: What do we meditate upon?’ Continuing his talk, Baba said: ‘Kundalini starts dancing when one repeats Om Namah Shivaya.’Hearing this, I mentally repeated the mantra, I noticed that my breathing was getting heavier. Suddenly, I felt a great impact of a rising force within me. The intensity of this rising kundalini force was so tremendous that my body lifted up a little and fell flat into the aisle; my eyeglasses flew off. As I lay there with my eyes closed, I could see a continuous fountain of dazzling white lights erupting within me. In brilliance, these lights were brighter than the sun but possessed no heat at all. I was experiencing the thought-free state of "I am," realizing that "I" have always been, and will continue to be, eternal. I was fully conscious and completely aware while I was experiencing the pure "I am," a state of supreme bliss. Outwardly, at that precise moment, Baba shouted delightedly from his platform, "Mene kuch nahi kiya; kisiko shakti ne pakda" ("I didn’t do anything. The Energy has caught someone"). Baba noticed that the dramatic awakening of kundalini in me frightened some people in the audience. Therefore, he said, ‘Do not be frightened. Sometimes kundalini gets awakened in this way, depending upon a person's type.

Related concepts 

In Sahaj Marg, yogic transmission is named Pranahuti (Devanagari: ,) from prāṇā, "life force" and āhūti, "offering". It is described as "the gracious and conscious offering of the life force or spirit by the Guru into the disciple’s heart."

See also
 Ramana Maharshi
 Dhyanyogi Madhusudandas

Notes

References

Shaivism
Kashmir Shaivism
Hindu tantra
Tantric practices
Esoteric schools of thought
Hindu prayer and meditation
Hindu philosophical concepts
Spiritual faculties
Sanskrit words and phrases
Hindi words and phrases